The 2016 Belgian Super Cup was a football match that took take place on 23 July 2016, between the 2015–16 Belgian Pro League winners Club Brugge and Standard Liège, the winners of the 2015–16 Belgian Cup. Club Brugge played their 17th Super Cup and featured in their second consecutive Super Cup after losing the 2015 Belgian Super Cup to Gent, while Standard Liège played their 8th Belgian Super Cup after last appearing in 2011 when they lost to Genk. Although together both teams have already played 23 times the Belgian Super Cup, they have never met each other in this competition. Standard Liège last success in the competition dates from a 2-0 win in 2009, against Genk, while Club Brugge last won in 2005 against the now defunct team Germinal Beerschot. The match was however a replay of the 2016 Belgian Cup Final, won by Standard Liège in March 2016.

Match

Details

See also
2015–16 Belgian Pro League
2015–16 Belgian Cup

References

2016
Club Brugge KV matches
Standard Liège matches
Supercup
Belgian Super Cup